No. 9 Squadron  (Wolfpack) is a fighter squadron and is equipped with Mirage 2000 and based at Gwalior AFS under Central Air Command.

History
The No. 9 Squadron was formed after the partition of British Sub Continent.
The original No. 9 Squadron was handed over to Pakistan as the No.9 Squadron Griffins.

Assignments

Indo-Pakistani War of 1965
Indo-Pakistani War of 1971
Operation Safed Sagar - Kargil War (Indo-Pak War of 1999)
Balakot Strike 2019

Aircraft

References

009
Military units and formations of India in World War II
1944 establishments in India